The 1969 Bowling Green Falcons football team was an American football team that represented Bowling Green University in the Mid-American Conference (MAC) during the 1969 NCAA University Division football season. In their second season under head coach Don Nehlen, the Falcons compiled a 6–4 record (4–1 against MAC opponents), finished in second place in the MAC, and outscored opponents by a combined total of 179 to 146.

The team's statistical leaders included Vern Wireman with 1,666 passing yards, Isaac Wright with 344 rushing yards, and Bob Zimpfer with 785 receiving yards.

Schedule

References

Bowling Green
Bowling Green Falcons football seasons
Bowling Green Falcons football